Hsieh Cheng-peng and Yang Tsung-hua were the defending champions but Yang did not compete. Hsieh partnered with Huang Liang-chi but they lost in the third round to Alexandros-Ferdinandos Georgoudas and Andrei Vasilevski.

Pierre-Hugues Herbert and Kevin Krawietz defeated Julien Obry and Adrien Puget in the final, 6–7(3–7), 6–2, 12–10 to win the boys' doubles tennis title at the 2009 Wimbledon Championships.

Seeds

  Andrea Collarini /  Agustín Velotti (quarterfinals)
  Hsieh Cheng-peng /  Huang Liang-chi (quarterfinals)
  Facundo Arguello /  Julen Urigüen (first round)
  Evan King /  Denis Kudla (quarterfinals)
  Arthur De Greef /  Gianni Mina (withdrew)
  Hiroyasu Ehara /  Shuichi Sekiguchi (first round)
  Andrey Kuznetsov /  Dominik Schulz (withdrew)
  Daniel Berta /  Radim Urbanek (first round)

Draw

Finals

Top half

Bottom half

References

External links

Boys' Doubles
Wimbledon Championship by year – Boys' doubles